The  Master of Naval Ordnance was an English Navy appointment created in 1546 the office holder was one of the Chief Officers of the Admiralty and a member of the Council of the Marine and a member of the Office of Ordnance until the post was abolished in 1589. He was responsible for the supply of naval ordnance for the navy.

History
The office of Master of Naval Ordnance was a specific post within Office of Ordnance established in 1546 during the reign of Henry VIII of England. He was initially assigned to the Council of the Marine acted as a liaison between both. The post holder was responsible for the supply of naval ordnance for the navy. The post existed until 1589 when it was abolished.

Office holders
Included:
 Vice-Admiral, Sir William Woodhouse, MP, 1546-1552
 Vice Admiral Sir Thomas Wyndham, 1st Lord Felbrigg, 1552-1553
 Vice Admiral Sir William Wynter, 1557-1589 (also Surveyor and Rigger of the Navy)

Citations

Sources
  Childs, David (2009). Tudor Sea Power: The Foundation of Greatness. Barnsley, England: Seaforth Publishing. .
 National Archives UK: Accounts as Master of Naval Ordnance: D421: 1561-69,
 Rodger, N.A.M. (1997). "Council of the Marine: Administration 1509 to 1574". The safeguard of the sea : a naval history of Britain. Vol 1., 660-1649. London, England: Penguin. .

16th-century Royal Navy personnel
M